Assmann, Aßmann or Assman is a German surname. Notable people with the surname include:

 Aleida Assmann (born 1947), professor of Egyptology, literary and cultural studies
 Arno Assmann (1908–1979), German actor and film director
 Charles Assmann (born 1972), Canadian football player
 Dick Assman (1934–2016), Canadian petrol station owner
 Fabián Assmann (born 1986), Argentine football goalkeeper
 Hans Assmann (1923–1998), alleged KGB intelligence officer
 Hans Erasmus Aßmann (1646–1699), German poet, statesman and translator
 Jan Assmann (born 1938), German Egyptologist
Katja Aßmann (born 1971), German art historian
 Peter Assmann (born 1963), Austrian writer and visual artist
 Richard Assmann (1845–1918), meteorologist
 Sarah M. Assmann, American biologist
 William F. Assmann (1862–1920), balloonist

See also 
 "The Assman", a working title of "The Fusilli Jerry", a Seinfeld episode

Surnames from given names